Dyomyx is a genus of moths of the family Erebidae. The genus was erected by Achille Guenée in 1852.

Species

References

Calpinae